The Çağ University is a private non-profit university in Mersin Province, Turkey. It was established officially on 9 July 1997 by Bayboğan Education Foundation in Adana. "Çağ" means "epoch".

The majority of students are from Adana.

Currently, there are three more universities in the Province of Mersin; Mersin University and Tarsus University are public universities and Toros University is another private university.

Academic units 
Presently the units of the university are as follows
Faculty of Law
Faculty of Arts and Sciences
Faculty of Economic and Administrative Sciences

There is also a vocational school for 9 programs, an English preparatory school and an institute of Social sciences.

References

Private universities and colleges in Turkey
Buildings and structures in Mersin Province
Educational institutions established in 1997
1997 establishments in Turkey